Sophie was a Belgian comics series, originally written by Vicq and co-written and drawn by Jidéhem. It follows the adventures of a young girl and was prepublished in Spirou between 1965 and 1994. The series was notable for being the first comic strip series in Spirou with a female character as its leading character.

History
Sophie was originally a side character in Jidéhem's Starter, which was a column dedicated to automobiles in Spirou. Starter featured the adventures of a young mechanic, Starter, and a young female companion named Sophie. When readers showed more interest in Sophie than in Starter she received her own spin-off.

Concept
Sophie is a young black-haired, pig-tailed girl who is the daughter of electrotechnician Mr. Karapolie. She was named after Jidéhem's own daughter. They both live in a villa in a quiet neighborhood outside the city, where they are aided by a butler, Joseph. Sophie has three friends, Starter and Pipette, who work as mechanics and Petit Bernard, a little boy who is two years younger than her and far more cowardly. Pipette furthermore owns a black car, Zoë, with a sentient mind. Many storylines revolve around criminals who want to steal the inventions of Sophie's father.

Albums
 L' Oeuf de Karamazout (1968)
 La Bulle de Silence (1968)
 Les Bonheurs de Sophie (1st series) (1969)
 Qui fait peur à Zoè? (1970)
 Sophie et le Rayon Kâ (1971)
 La Maison d'en face (1972)
 Sophie et le Cube qui parle (1972)
 Les Bonheurs de Sophie (2nd series) (1973)
 La Tiare de Matlotl Halatomal (1974)
 Sophie et le Douanier Rousseau (1976)
 Cette Sacrée Sophie (1977)
 Les Quatre Saisons (1978)
 Sophie et l'Inspecteur Céleste (1979)
 Sophie et Donald Mac Donald (1980)
 Rétro Sophie (1981)
 Sophie et Cie (1984)
 Don Giovanni (1990)
 L'Odyssée du U 522 (1991)
 Le Tombeau des Glyphes (1995)

Sources

Belgian comics titles
Belgian comic strips
1965 comics debuts
1994 comics endings
Comics characters introduced in 1965
Female characters in comics
Child characters in comics
Belgian comics characters
Fictional Belgian people
Humor comics
Adventure comics
Motorsports comics
Comics spin-offs
Comics set in Belgium
Dupuis titles
Comics set in the 1960s
Comics set in the 1970s
Comics set in the 1980s
Comics set in the 1990s